Sardarkent is a rural locality (a selo) in Alkadarsky Selsoviet, Suleyman-Stalsky District, Republic of Dagestan, Russia. The population was 718 as of 2010. There are 14 streets.

Geography 
Sardarkent is located on the left bank of the Chiragchay River, 9 km northwest of Kasumkent (the district's administrative centre) by road. Chilikar and Koshkent are the nearest rural localities.

Nationalities 
Lezgins live there.

References 

Rural localities in Suleyman-Stalsky District